Rhododendron insigne (不凡杜鹃) is a rhododendron species native to southern Sichuan in China, where it grows at altitudes of . The flowers are pale to dark pink.

References

 "Rhododendron insigne", Hemsley & E. H. Wilson, Bull. Misc. Inform. Kew. 1910: 113. 1910.

insigne